James Donald Taiclet, Jr. is an American business executive who has been serving as the chairman, president and chief executive officer (CEO) of Lockheed Martin since 2020.

Early life and education 
James Taiclet was born in Pittsburgh, Pennsylvania, in 1960. His father, James Sr., served in the U.S. Army at the Wiesbaden Air Base in Germany and later became a boilermaker in Pittsburgh. His mother, Mary Ann (née Foley), was a homemaker and school administrator.

Taiclet graduated from the U.S. Air Force Academy in 1982 with a degree in engineering and international relations. While at the Academy, Taiclet played on the rugby team, serving as captain during his senior year.

Taiclet holds a master’s degree in public affairs from Princeton University. Taiclet has a fellowship at the Princeton School of Public and International Affairs.

Military service
From 1985 to 1991, Taiclet was a pilot in the United States Air Force, serving as aircraft commander, instructor pilot and unit chief of standardization and evaluation. During Operation Desert Shield, he flew multiple missions in a Lockheed C-141 Starlifter transport jet. His rotational assignments included the Joint Staff and Air Staff at the Pentagon.

Business career 
Taiclet first entered the private sector as a management consultant at McKinsey & Co. from July 1991 to February 1996. He then joined Pratt & Whitney as vice president of engine services until 1999, and then served as president of Honeywell Aerospace Services until 2001.

In 2001, American Tower recruited Taiclet for the role of chief operating officer. He was named chief executive officer of American Tower in October 2003 after the departure of Steven B. Dodge and was selected as chairman of the board in February 2004. He remained as CEO and on the board of American Tower until 2020. 

In 2018, Taiclet joined the board of directors of Lockheed Martin. 

In June of 2020 Taiclet was named as CEO of Lockheed Martin, succeeding Marillyn Hewson.
He was named chairman of the company in January 2021.

Philanthropy and memberships 
While he was CEO of American Tower, Taiclet and his wife supported the Newton-Wellesley Hospital Charitable Foundation as well as the Charles River Center. He also serves on the board of the Brigham and Women’s Hospital as a trustee. 

Taiclet hold memberships on the boards of various non-profits and NGO's such as the  Council on Foreign Relations, Catalyst.org, the U.S.-India Business Council, the U.S.-India Strategic Partnership Forum, and has attended the World Economic Forum.

Awards and recognition 
From 2013 to 2018, Taiclet was named to Harvard Business Review’s list of Best-Performing CEOs in the World.

Personal life 
Taiclet runs and cycles for exercise.

Taiclet is a lifelong Pittsburgh Steelers fan.

References

External links 
 James Taiclet Bio on Lockheed Martin website  
 James Taiclet profile on Linkedin

1960 births
Living people
Lockheed Martin people
Princeton University alumni
McKinsey & Company people
United States Air Force Academy alumni
21st-century American businesspeople
American technology chief executives
20th-century American businesspeople
American technology businesspeople
American technology executives
People from Pittsburgh